Luka Anthony Ubur is a South Sudanese politician. He has served as County Commissioner of Wau County, Western Bahr el Ghazal since 18 May 2010.

References

Living people
County Commissioners of South Sudan
Year of birth missing (living people)
People from Western Bahr el Ghazal
Place of birth missing (living people)
21st-century South Sudanese politicians